Monique Nsanzabaganwa is a Rwandan economist, politician and diplomat, who has served as the vice-chairperson of the African Union Commission, effective 6 February 2021. Before that, between 2011 and 2021, she served as the deputy governor of the National Bank of Rwanda.

Background and education
She was born in Rwanda circa 1971, and attended Rwandan schools prior to her University education. She holds a Bachelor of Arts degree in economics, from the National University of Rwanda. She studied at Stellenbosch University, in South Africa, graduating with a Master of Arts in economics, followed by a Doctor of Philosophy, also in economics.

Career
Following her graduate studies abroad, she returned to Rwanda and worked as a lecturer in economics at the National University of Rwanda, from 1999 until 2003. Between 2003 and 2008, she served as the Minister of State responsible for Economic Planning in the Rwanda Ministry of Finance and Economic Planning. From 2008 until 2011 she was the Minister of Trade and Industry in the Rwandan cabinet.

As state minister for economic planning, Nsanzabaganwa is credited with creating a stronger statistical and planning system nationally and at local levels. She was a leader of the drive to establish the National Institute of Statistics of Rwanda. She is also credited with leading the efforts to set up the legal framework and policy guidelines for microfinance in Rwanda.

Other considerations
She is a member of the African Leaders Network, a Fellow of the Aspen Global Leadership Network (AGLN), a Fellow of the Africa Leadership Initiative (ALI) East Africa and a Fellow of the John F. Kennedy School of Government's Executive Education in Public Financial Management. She has served as the chairperson of the board of directors of the National Institute of Statistics of Rwanda, since 2012.

Personal life
Nsanzabaganwa is a married mother of three children; two sons and one daughter.

See also
 Cabinet of Rwanda
 Parliament of Rwanda
 John Rwangombwa
 Aishah Ahmad

References

External links

 Website of the African Union Commission

Living people
1971 births
Rwandan economists
National University of Rwanda alumni
Rwandan diplomats
Academic staff of the National University of Rwanda
Stellenbosch University alumni
21st-century Rwandan politicians
21st-century Rwandan women politicians
Rwandan women diplomats
Women government ministers of Rwanda
Finance ministers of Rwanda
Industry ministers of Rwanda
Trade ministers of Rwanda